Michael Barakan (born 29 April 1954, in London, England), known as Shane Fontayne, is an English rock guitarist. Active since the 1970s, he was the guitarist for Bruce Springsteen during the 1992–1993 "Other Band" Tour, as Springsteen had disbanded his own E Street Band three years earlier. During his career Fontayne has worked with Ian Hunter, Van Zant, John Waite, Chris Botti, Joe Cocker, Johnny Hallyday, Marc Cohn, Randy VanWarmer, Graham Nash, Mick Ronson and others.

Career
In the 1970s Fontayne was associated with Byzantium,  an English psychedelic music band, after being in their precursor Ora, and over the years has worked with a range of artists, including Steve Forbert (Little Stevie Orbit, 1980 album), Maria McKee (Maria McKee, 1989 album) and later Joe Cocker (Heart & Soul, 2004 album), Richard Marx (My Own Best Enemy, 2004 album).

He has also been the guitarist for the French rocker Johnny Hallyday for his 1995 tour "Lorada tour", and 1996 concert in Las Vegas. In addition, Fontayne has been singer/songwriter Marc Cohn's touring guitarist since 1998.  He has recently worked with Crosby, Stills & Nash and Graham Nash (solo) on tour (also producing the latter's 2016 album This Path Tonight).

On 2 December 2012, Fontayne played lead electric guitar for Ann and Nancy Wilson's version of "Stairway to Heaven" with Jason Bonham taking his father's position on drums honoring the remaining members of Led Zeppelin at the Kennedy Center Honors ceremony.

Personal life
Fontayne was married to actress Mackenzie Phillips from 1986 to 2000, and has a son with her, also named Shane, born in 1987. Fontayne's older brother Peter is a well known music critic in Japan.

Discography
1991: "Merchants of Venus"
2003: What Nature Intended
2006: Voodoo at the Mint

References

External links
 Official website
 Shane Fontayne CD Baby
 
 Shane Fontayne at Discogs
 Shane Fontayne Interview NAMM Oral History Library (2017)

1954 births
Living people
English people of Polish-Jewish descent
English rock guitarists
English session musicians
People educated at University College School
Bruce Springsteen
Slide guitarists